Holly & Fearne Go Dating is a British reality TV show which was first broadcast on ITV on 5 September 2007.

Format
In the six-part series, Holly Willoughby and Fearne Cotton embarked on a mission in each episode to each find an ideal match for one of love's losers.

The show ended with a dinner date at the Hell's Kitchen restaurant in London. Here, the lonely heart enjoyed the company of both dates, one after the other. By the end of the night, the lonely heart had to choose either Cotton's or Willoughby's choice.

It is unlikely that the show will return. Willoughby presented a similar series, the revived Streetmate, on ITV2 in September/October 2007.

Viewing figures
Episode 1: 2.1m, 11% share
Episode 2: 1.8m, 9%
Episode 3: 1.6m, 8%
Episode 4: 1.8m, 9%
Episode 5: 1.10m, 5%
Episode 6: 1.7m, 9%

References

External links

2000s British reality television series
2007 British television series debuts
2007 British television series endings
British dating and relationship reality television series
ITV reality television shows
Television series by ITV Studios
Television shows produced by Granada Television
English-language television shows